Further on Tomorrow is the debut album by Rhode Island-based singer-songwriter Marc Berardo a.k.a. Marc Douglas Berardo

Track listing 
All songs written by Marc Douglas Berardo
 "Stand Alone" 
 "Leave You Behind" 
 "(Stay Off) The Broken Road" 
 "St. Augustine"
 "The Love I Had" 
 "Stephen Marshall" 
 "Until the Rain Comes Down Again" 
 "Losing Ground"
 "Fading Colors"
 "Good Enough For Now" 
 "When The Day Is Done"

Credits

Musicians
 Marc Douglas Berardo – Acoustic Guitar, vocals, keyboards, snare, percussion, lead guitars
 Michael Branden – Harmony vocals, acoustic guitar, advice
 Pete Szymanski – Electric bass, standup bass, keyboards
 Dick Neal – Dobro, banjo, Volkswagen keys, the Fabulous E-Brow, pedal steel 
 Chris Berardo – Percussion, gigs
 Tom Marotta – Bass, vocals
 Bill Lopez – Piano and cello
 Pat Berardo – Vocal on "Get Happy"

Production
Producers – Michael Branden, Pete Szymanski, and Marc Douglas Berardo 
Engineering – Michael Branden at Hayloft Studios, Milford, CT. and Pete Szymanski assisted by Dick Neal at Ski Studios, Bridgeport, CT. 
Mixing – Pete Szymanski and Marc Douglas Berardo at Ski Studios, Bridgeport, CT.
Mastering – Glen Matullo at Orphan Studios

Artwork
 Marc Douglas Berardo, Michael Branden, Brett Donahue – Art Direction and Design
 Sandy Garnett Studio – Layout
 Le Brango – Lettering
 Sue Wilkey – Guitar and Moon logo (Inside Cover)
 Brett Donahue – Photograph for the Hayloft (Inside Cover)
 Marc Douglas Berardo * Brett Donahue – Tin Cup Photo (Inside Cover)

Notes

1998 debut albums
Marc Douglas Berardo albums